A Touch of Evil: Live is the fifth live album by English heavy metal band Judas Priest. It was released in the UK on 13 July 2009 and in the US on 14 July via Sony and Epic.

Background
The album is the first live album with original vocalist Rob Halford since they reunited, and also the final Judas Priest production to feature guitarist K. K. Downing before his retirement in 2011. It was recorded during the band's 2005, 2008 and 2009 world tours (except for the 2008 and 2009 tour songs, all the rest is taken from 2005's DVD Rising in the East), and released on 14 July 2009.

Recorded by Martin Walker and Brian Thorene, A Touch of Evil: Live also marks the first Priest album that long-time producer Tom Allom has worked on since 1988's Ram It Down  (co-producing along with the band).

According to Billboard, this live album sold around 5,300 copies in the United States in its first week of release to debut at position No. 87 on The Billboard 200 chart.

The track "Dissident Aggressor", originally recorded for their 1977 album Sin After Sin, won the Grammy award for Best Metal Performance in 2010.

Track listing

Personnel
Judas Priest
Rob Halford – vocals
Glenn Tipton – guitars
K. K. Downing – guitars
Ian Hill – bass
Scott Travis – drums

Production
Produced by Tom Allom & Judas Priest
Recorded by Martin Walker & Brian Thorene
Mixed by Richie Kayvan & Tom Allom
Mastered by Kevin Metcalfe
Artwork by Mark Wilkinson
Photography by Ross Halfin & Omar Franchi

Charts

References

Judas Priest live albums
Albums produced by Tom Allom
2009 live albums